Frank Adams (1861–1940) was a politician in Florida. He served as a state senator, representing Hamilton County, Florida

His father Robert Watkins Adams also served in the Florida Senate and his son Robert Stanley Adams (died  1943) also became a state senator in Florida.

In 1899 he served as president of the Florida Senate.
He setved as the president of the Florida state senate for two terms, the first to do so since the enactment of the state constitution.

See also
List of presidents of the Florida Senate

References

External links
 

1861 births
1940 deaths
Florida state senators
Presidents of the Florida Senate